Vjačeslavs Kudrjavcevs (born 30 March 1998 in Latvia) is a Latvian footballer.

Career

At the age of 16, Kudrajavcevs debuted for Jūrmala in the Latvian top flight. After that, he signed for second division side SK Babīte, helping them achieve promotion before being sent on loan to top flight club Riga, where he failed to make a league appearance. 

For the second half of 2017/18, Kudrajavcevs signed for Legia Warsaw, the most successful Polish team, where he again failed to make an appearance.

For the second half of 2019/20, he signed for Stomil Olsztyn in the Polish second division.

References

External links
 Vjačeslavs Kudrjavcevs at Soccerway

Latvian footballers
Living people
Association football goalkeepers
Expatriate footballers in Poland
1998 births
FC Jūrmala players
FK Ventspils players
OKS Stomil Olsztyn players